Minabad Rural District is in Anbaran  District of Namin County, Ardabil province, Iran. At the census of 2006, its population was 3,625 in 874 households; there were 3,055 inhabitants in 883 households at the following census of 2011; and in the most recent census of 2016, the population of the rural district was 2,851 in 848 households. The largest of its four villages was Minabad, with 1,139 people.

References 

Namin County

Rural Districts of Ardabil Province

Populated places in Ardabil Province

Populated places in Namin County